Barra de Tortuguero Airport , is an airport serving Tortuguero village and Tortuguero National Park in Pococí Canton, Limón Province, Costa Rica.

Tortuguero Airport is managed by Costa Rica's Directorate General of Civil Aviation. In 2014, the airport registered 11,577 passengers.

Airlines and destinations

Passenger statistics

These data show number of passengers movements into the airport, according to the Directorate General of Civil Aviation of Costa Rica's Statistical Yearbooks.

See also
Transport in Costa Rica
List of airports in Costa Rica

References

External links
OurAirports - Barra del Tortuguero Airport

Airports in Costa Rica
Buildings and structures in Limón Province